Orange tip or orangetip refers to:

 Anthocharini, a tribe of butterflies.
 Anthocharis, a specific genus in the tribe Anthocharini.
 Anthocharis cardamines, a single species in the genus Anthocharis, commonly found in Europe and temperate Asia.
 Colotis, a genus of butterflies in the tribe Colotini endemic to Africa and India.
 Hebomoia glaucippe, the great orange tip butterfly.

Animal common name disambiguation pages